Vanyo Shishkov (born 6 May 1969) is a former Bulgarian footballer.

Career

Born in Stara Zagora, Shishkov spent the majority of his playing days in the top flight of Bulgarian football, with his career being associated most notably with Beroe in the late 1980s and early 1990s as well as with Bulgarian powerhouse CSKA Sofia between 1992 and 1994. He played 8 matches for the "armymen" in European tournaments, scoring 6 goals in the process. During the later stages of his footballing career, Shishkov also had short spells in Tunisia (winning the national league with Espérance) and Greece. Following his retirement from the game of football, Shishkov switched to police work.

References

1969 births
Living people
Bulgarian footballers
Association football forwards
Sportspeople from Stara Zagora
PFC CSKA Sofia players
PFC Beroe Stara Zagora players
PFC Slavia Sofia players
PFC Belasitsa Petrich players
PFC Dobrudzha Dobrich players
Akademik Sofia players
Espérance Sportive de Tunis players
First Professional Football League (Bulgaria) players
Expatriate footballers in Tunisia
Expatriate footballers in Greece
Bulgarian expatriate sportspeople in Greece
Bulgarian expatriate footballers